Cyclone is the third studio album and the seventh album overall by the American hip hop recording artist Baby Bash, released by Arista Records on October 30, 2007.

Background 
Bash has worked a long time with Happy Perez. Working with Perez, in particular, holds a special significance for him. "It's my recipe, my formula," he says. "I've been using it ever since I met Happy Perez. He did "Suga Suga", "Obsession". Without him, there'd be no Baby Bash or Frankie J.. Happy P is the one that made those beats that blew up for us." Other collaborators include J. R. Rotem, Play-N-Skillz, Ryan Tedder, Aundrea Fimbres of Danity Kane, and Paula DeAnda.

Cyclone is the first Baby Bash album not to contain a Parental Advisory sticker.

Singles 
Singles released from the album include "Cyclone" featuring T-Pain, "What Is It" featuring Sean Kingston and "Don't Stop" featuring Keith Sweat.

Reception

Commercial reception 
Cyclone entered the U.S. Billboard 200 chart at number 30, selling about 26,000 copies in its first week.

Critical reception 
David Jeffries of Allmusic praised the album for its "pop moments" but said that the album is nothing "memorable".

Track listing

 "Numero Uno" contains a sample from "Let's Get Together" by Bobby Bland
 "What Is It" contains a portion of the composition "9MM Goes Bang" by KRS-One
 "Mamacita" contains a sample of "Voyage to Atlantis" by The Isley Brothers

Charts

References 

&  &

2007 albums
Albums produced by Happy Perez
Albums produced by J. R. Rotem
Albums produced by Jim Jonsin
Albums produced by Lil Jon
Albums produced by Ryan Tedder
Albums produced by Scoop DeVille
Baby Bash albums